The 2019 Ivy League men's basketball tournament was the postseason men's basketball tournament for the Ivy League of the 2018–19 NCAA Division I men's basketball season. It was held on March 16 and 17, 2019, at the John J. Lee Amphitheater on the campus of Yale University in New Haven, Connecticut. League co-champions Harvard and Yale met in the final with Yale winning 97–85. Yale received the Ivy League's automatic bid to the 2019 NCAA tournament. Yale lost 74–79 in the first round to (3) LSU.

This was the last Ivy League tournament to be held for three years due to COVID-19 disruptions. The 2020 edition was never played, and the Ivy League canceled its entire 2020–21 season.

Seeds
The top four teams in the Ivy League regular-season standings qualify for the tournament and are seeded according to their records in conference play, resulting in a Shaughnessy playoff. If a tie for any of the top four positions exists, tiebreakers are applied in the following order:
 Head-to-head record between teams involved in the tie.
 Record against the top team(s) not involved in the tie in order of conference record, going down through the seedings until the tie is broken.
 Average of the teams' ranking in the following computer systems: NCAA NET, Sagarin, KenPom, and ESPN Basketball Percentage Index.

Schedule

Bracket

See also
 2019 Ivy League women's basketball tournament

References

Ivy League men's basketball tournament
Tournament
Ivy League Men's B
Sports competitions in New Haven, Connecticut
College basketball tournaments in Connecticut